, also known as , is a Japanese actor and singer. He played young men and onnagata roles of women.

Biography
His father is the head of the theatre troupe Gekidan Sujaku. Saotome performed in taishū engeki. A "female impersonator", he has performed onstage. In Zatoichi, he played the child disguising himself as a geisha (Daigoro Tachibana). Though in a different troupe from Tachibana, they frequently practiced and performed together. In Takeshis', Saotome played a young female impersonator and dancer. He played a bishōnen aesthetic, i.e. graceful, beautiful young men. He played Mori Ranmaru in a National Museum event called "Sengoku Fantasy", and played a young Horibe Yasubee in the NHK New Year's jidaigeki play. He created his official fan club in 2006. He said that he misunderstand his appeal, but is happy about his role. He appeared in the variety show D no Gekijō in January 2007. It was arranged he reprised a role, a dance in a flower-decorated kimono at the Taishōkan. The performance ended the next day. Saotome has expressed a desire to play men's roles and to perform in more mainstream or traditional theatre, saying he has less care for female roles. He starred in the stage production of the otome game, Hakuouki in October 2010. He played vice commander, Hijikata Toshizo of Shinsengumi.

Filmography

Film
 Zatoichi (2003), Young O-Sei
 Takeshis' (2005), Unnamed young man
 Shabake (2007), Suzuhiko-hime
 Anmitsu Hime (2008), Sandayu Momoyama
 Crows Explode (2014), Ryohei Kagami
 Road To High&Low (2016), Ryu Tatsuhito
 High&Low The Movie (2016), Ryu Tatsuhito
 High&Low The Red Rain (2016), Ryu Tatsuhito
 Memoirs of a Murderer (2017), Toda
 Bleach (2018), Renji Abarai
 Shottan, The Miracle (2018), Daisuke Katō
 Iwane: Sword of Serenity (2019), Kuniemon
 Promare (2019), Lio Fotia (voice)
 Last of the Wolves (2021), Masaru Hanada
 Shikake-nin Fujieda Baian (2023)

Television
 Fūrin Kazan (2007) – Hōjō Ujimasa
 Shinzanmono (2010) – Kazuhiro Uesugi
 Miss Double Faced Teacher (2012) – Tatsuya Sudo
 Nobunaga Concerto (2014) – Danzo
 Futagashira (2015–2016) – Soji
 High＆Low: The Story of S.W.O.R.D. (2015–2016) – Ryu Tatsuhito
 Nobunaga Moyu (2016) – Nobutada Oda
 Cold Case 2 (2018) 
 Boukyaku no Sachiko: A Meal Makes Her Forget (2018) – Shungo
 Tokyo Bachelors (2019) – Ritsuki Itoi
 Come Come Everybody (2021–22) – Tommy

References
 This content is derived largely from the corresponding article on the Japanese Wikipedia and on Saotome's official website (Accessed 2 March 2007).

External links
 早乙女太一 OFFICIAL FAN CLUB
 早乙女太一 OFFICIAL MOBILE
 
 早乙女太一オフィシャルブログ Powered by Ameba - 早乙女太一公式ブログ
 早乙女太一 公式ブログ - GREE 
 早乙女太一 電子書籍特設ページ - デジタルブックファクトリー 

1991 births
21st-century Japanese male actors
Japanese male dancers
Japanese male film actors
Japanese male stage actors
Japanese male child actors
Japanese male television actors
LDH (company) artists
Living people
People from Dazaifu, Fukuoka